Prem Mandir  (lit.  The Temple of Divine Love) is a Hindu temple in Vrindavan, Mathura district, Uttar Pradesh, India. The temple was established by Jagadguru Shri Kripalu Ji Maharaj (the fifth Original Jagadguru). It is maintained by Jagadguru Kripalu Parishat, an international non-profit, educational, spiritual, charitable trust.
The complex is on a 55-acre site on the outskirts of Vrindavan. It is dedicated to Radha Krishna and Sita Ram. Radha Krishna are on the first level and Sita Ram are on the second level.
Different Leelas of Shri Krishna and Rasik saints are depicted all over the wall of the main temple.

Construction began in January 2001 and the inauguration ceremony took place from 15 to 17 February 2012. The temple was opened to public on 17 February. The cost was 150 crore rupees ($23 million). The presiding deity are Shri Radha Govind (Radha Krishna) and Shri Sita Ram. A 73,000 square feet, pillar-less, dome shaped satsang hall is being constructed next to Prem Mandir, which will accommodate 25,000 people at a time. Surrounded by beautiful gardens and fountains, the temple complex has life-size depictions of four leelas of Shri Krishna – Jhulan leela, Govardhan leela, Raas leela and Kaliya Naag leela.

It is sister temple of Bhakti Mandir which was opened in 2005 and another sister temple which is known as Kirti Mandir, Barsana opened in 2019.

History architecture and design

The foundation stone was laid by Jagadguru Shri Kripalu Ji Maharaj in the presence of thousand devotees on 14 January 2001. The structure took around 12 years to construct, involving around 1000 artisans.

The Vrindavan site was developed by Kripalu Ji Maharaj, whose main ashram was at Vrindavan. He dedicated the gift of love to Shri Vrindavan Dham.

Prem Mandir is constructed entirely of Italian marble. The total dimensions of the temple including its flag is 125 ft. high, 190 ft. long and the 128 ft. wide raised platform serves as the seat of the two-storeyed white monument.

A circumambulation route has been constructed on the mandir prāṅgaṇa (प्राङ्गण), the platform of the temple, enabling visitors to view the 48 panels depicting the pastimes of Shri Radha Krishna which are carved on the outer walls of the temple. The walls are made of solid Italian marble, 3.25 ft. thick. The thickness of the walls of the garbha-griha is 8 ft to bear the weight of huge shikhar, swarna kalash and the flag. 84 panels have also been set up on the exterior of the temple and display the loving pastimes of Shri Radha Krishna. Other than this, numerous portraits of Radha Krishna Leela, or the miracles of Lord Krishna, can also be found inside the temple.

Events
Jagadguruttam Diwas Mahotsav
Janmashtami
Radhastami

See also

Vrindavan Chandrodaya Mandir
Banke Bihari Temple
Radha Rani Temple
Radha Raman Temple
Rangeeli Mahal Barsana
Krishna Balaram Mandir
Bhakti Mandir Mangarh
Radha Damodar Temple, Vrindavan
Radha Madan Mohan Temple, Vrindavan

References

External links
Prem Mandir
Prem Mandir Vrindavan
Prem Mandir Vrindavan Complete Info
Prem Mandir Vrindavan - thedivineindia.com

Radha Krishna temples
Krishna temples
Hindu temples in Mathura district
Vrindavan
Tourist attractions in Mathura district